Rohit Sharma (born 28 June 1993) is an Indian cricketer who plays for Haryana. He made his first-class debut on 30 October in the 2015–16 Ranji Trophy. He made his List A debut on 10 December 2015 in the 2015–16 Vijay Hazare Trophy. He made his Twenty20 debut on 2 January 2016 in the 2015–16 Syed Mushtaq Ali Trophy.

References

External links
 

1993 births
Living people
Indian cricketers
Haryana cricketers
People from Jhajjar